Norman "Norm" Wallman (born February 6, 1938) is a politician from the state of Nebraska in the Midwestern United States. A resident of Cortland, Nebraska, Wallman served two terms in the unicameral Nebraska Legislature, from 2007 to 2015. He was born in Gage County, Nebraska.

References

Living people
1938 births
People from Gage County, Nebraska
Democratic Party Nebraska state senators